Scouting in Ireland has hosted many jamborees and jamborettes since Scouting started there in 1908.

List

Cancelled jamborees
 2001: Causeway 2001 was planned by The Scout Association to be held in Co. Antrim. It was cancelled due to the 2001 outbreak of foot-and-mouth disease after extensive preparations took place.
 2013: Scouting Ireland's second jamboree was planned for 2013 in Stradbally Hall, home of the Electric Picnic music festival, in Stradbally Co. Laois. Deirdre Butler was the Camp Chief and in April 2013 Jamboree 2013 was cancelled due to lack of bookings.

Ballyfin '93 
Ballyfin '93 took place in the grounds of Ballyfin College, Co. Laois, between 27 July and 5 August 1993. It was hosted by the Catholic Boy Scouts of Ireland, with the support and assistance of Scouting Ireland SAI and the Scout Association in Northern Ireland (a branch of the Scout Association in the UK). It was the third of four such jamborees rotated among the three Scout Associations in Ireland. Portumna '85, and Gosford '89 preceded it, while it was followed by Lough Dan '97. The jamboree song "The Spirit Lives On" was a version of that used for the 15th World Scout Jamboree in Canada in 1983.
The campsite was split into seven subcamps for Scout Troops, Cub Scouts and staff, each named after an Irish Lake/Lough.
One of the highlights of the jamboree was a charity fundraising day in aid of UNICEF. As it took place on visitors' day, troops and staff set up stalls to raise money by selling items of food, or with novelty competitions.

Jamboree 2008 

Jamboree 2008 was Scouting Ireland's first international Jamboree that was held from 2–10 August 2008. It took place on the grounds of the Punchestown Racecourse, County Kildare. The aim of the Jamboree was to celebrate one hundred years of Scouting in Ireland. Over 12,000 Irish and overseas Scouts attended. The camp chief for Jamboree 2008 was Christy McCann. Punchestown Racecourse was chosen to host the Jamboree, having previously hosted the Creamfields, Witnness and Oxegen music festivals, and as such has often been used as a campsite for large numbers, however never for a duration of 10 days.

The Camp Chief Christy McCann arrived in a coast guard helicopter to open the jamboree and flags of the attending countries were raised. The ceremony finished with a fireworks display.

The campsite was split into a total of nine subcamps; six of these subcamps were for attending Scout groups and Cub/Macaoimh packs and one each for Venture groups, families of staff and Staff members. Each subcamp is named after Irish geographical or heritage sites. The Jamboree had its very own radio station, called "Jam FM". The station broadcast on 95.9 FM and online to Local Kildare and west Wicklow areas via Three Rock Mountain. The format of the station was mainly commercial pop/rock and indie and with some talk.

The Camp Chief Challenge involved completing activities in order to collect enough points for the Camp Chief Challenge Pin. Tasks ranged from getting the Camp Chief's signature or attending a Scouts' Own to have a meal with another troop/pack/unit.

The Beaver and visitors day's were canceled due to torrential rain and flooding. The Jamboree was eventually curtailed due to the adverse weather conditions on 9 August, and no closing ceremony was held. Subcamps were evacuated at speed, with many foreign or long distance troop being forced to shelter in the Punchestown Racecourse bar.

JamboRí '18
JamboRí '18 took place from 25 July to 2 August at Stradbally Hall near Portlaoise in the midlands of Ireland. In 2014, Scouting Ireland's National Management Committee announced the intention to hold a jamboree in 2018, in preparation for hosting the World Scout Moot in 2021. The name of the jamboree was a play on the Irish word  which means King in Irish, with a theme of Rí-Create – Rí-Imagine and – Rí-Discover.

There was 9 sub camps, Each named after a fictional realm.

JamÓige
A Beaver and Cub Scout event over a long holiday weekend in June. Cub Scouts camp over-night for 3 nights and Beaver Scouts join, initially for the last night, but since 2012 for 2 last nights.
 JamÓige 2009: 29 May – 1 June. 4,250 attended in Dalgan Park, Co. Meath. Deirdre Butler was camp chief.
 JamÓige 2012: 1–4 June. 4,600 attended in Ardgillian Castle, Co. Dublin. David Kessie was camp chief.
 JamÓige 2016: 3–6 June. 4,500 attended in Pallaskenry, Co. Limerick. Stephen Halpin was camp chief.
 JamÓige 2022: 3–6 June. Jamangi. was deferred from 2021 due to the COVID-19 pandemic in Ireland.

See also

 Scouting Ireland
 Jamboree (Scouting)

References

Bibliography

External links
 Reading Central at Ballyfin '93
 official website
 Scouting Ireland's website

Scouting Ireland
Scouting and Guiding in Ireland
 
Scouting jamborees